This is a list of gliders/sailplanes of the world, (this reference lists all gliders with references, where available) 
Note: Any aircraft can glide for a short time, but gliders are designed to glide for longer.

French miscellaneous constructors 

 AAS Libération
 Abric-Calas 1909 biplane glider
 AC Mulhouse Mure – Aéro Club de Mulhouse
 ACBA 3 – Aéro Club du Bas Armagnac
 Aérostructure Lutin-80 – Aérostructure SARL
 Ateliers vosgiens 1909 glider
 Avialsa 60 Fauconnet
 Barel Graal – Graal Aéro – Berel, Max
 Baron Aéro Ramo-Planeur – A. Baron
 Belin bros. 1908 glider
 Bellanger-Denhaut BD-1
 Berger 1905 glider built by a M. Berger in Lyon and flown by Gardey
 Berliaux-Salètes 1909 glider no.1
 Berliaux-Salètes 1909 Pourquoi Pas? II
 Biot Massia
 Blériot II
 Bonnet-Clément BC-7 – BONNET, Pierre / Ets Louis Clément
 Boulay-Ferrier Condor – Jacques Boulay & Hubert Ferrier
 Boulay-Menin BM-1 – Jacques Boulay & Menin
 Bourieau-Chapautau glider
 Brylinski JJ-2 – Brylinsky, Jacques & Wehrle, Jean
 Brylinski JJ-3 – Brylinsky, Jacques & Wehrle, Jean
 Brylinski Petrel
 Bünzli 1908 glider – Bunzli, Henri René / Société de Construction d'Appareils Aériens, Levallois
 Calvel Frelon – Jacques Calvel
 CAU Frelon – Club Aéronautique Universitaire
 Caucase du Nord
 Caux 1922 glider – Jules Caux
 Clavé Goéland
 Clément Triplan
 Collard-Piel Compact
 Coupet-Guerchais glider
 Cousin Voilier
 d'Andre 1908 glider
 de Monge DMP-1
 de Rougé Elytroplan Sigma – De Rouge, Charles
 Domenjoz Planeur-Voilier – John Auguste Domenjoz
 Elytre
 Fage Dédale – Fage, Jacques
 Favier LF-3 –
 Ferber 5 – Ferber, Ferdinand
 Ferber P-1 – Ferber, Ferdinand
 Gabelier RG-40 – Gabelier, Raymond
 Gad'Arts AM-58
 Gilbert 1922 – Gilbert, J.
 Grandin Chauve-souris – Grandin, Henry
 Grandin Mouette – Grandin, Henry
 Groux – Groux, Georges
 Guilhabert Pou-Planeur
 Harth S-1 – Harth, Friedrich
 Hurel Aviette – Hurel, Maurice – man powered
 Jamin 1932 glider
 Kosellek G-1 Quo Vadis – Kosellek, Gilbert
 Kristal (avion)
 La Guêpe
 Lanaverre CS-II Cirrus
 Lanaverre SL-2 Janus
 Landes Oiseau Bleu – Landes Frères
 Landes-Bréguet Mouette – Landes Frères – Breguet, Louis
 Landes-Derouin – Landes Frères & Derouin
 Le Bris Aéro-Voilier
 Le Bris Albatros
 Le Bris La Barque Ailée
 Le Grolinet
 Lefort Triplan – Lefort, Lucien
 Leroy Motoplaneur – LEROY G., Aéroc-Club de l'Eure, Professeur Technique à l'École Professionelle d'Évreux
 Leyat 1909 glider – designed by Leyat, Marcel Constructed by Mr Audra, Die
 Leyat 1924 glider – designed by Leyat, Marcel Constructed by Association Française Aérienne
 Lucas L-6A – Lucas, Émile – Avions Émile Lucas
 Magnan Albatros
 Magnan M-2 Marin
 Magnan Vautour
 Magnard glider
 Massia-Biot
 Massy 1922 glider – Massy, Max
 Minéo M-5 – Mineo, Michel
 Minéo M-6 – Mineo, Michel
 Mudry CAP-1 – Avions Mudry Cie, Port d'attache, Cannes Mandelieu
 Nessler N-1 Aérovoilier – Nessler, Éric
 Nessler N-2 – Nessler, Éric
 Nessler N-3 – Nessler, Éric
 Nessler N-4 – Nessler, Éric
 Nogrady Tsarevitch – Nogrady, Claude Bela
 Nord 1300
 Nord 2000 – Nord Aviation
 Pastel MN 600 K – Montagne Noire
 Payre AM-56 – Payre, Georges
 Peulet Biplace Marcel Guittard – Peulet – Aéro-Club de Créteil
 Peulet PC-1 Bigorneau – Peulet – Aéro-Club de Créteil
 Peyret Alérion Tandem – Peyret, Louis
 Pimoule – Pimoule, J.
 Potez P-VIII – Potez, Henry
 Pou P AR-1 – Cosandy, Louis – Rocheblaye, Alain
 Renard Décaplan Aéride – Renard, Charles
 REP Type-1 – Robert Esnault-Pelterie
 REP Type-2 – Robert Esnault-Pelterie
 Riout 102T Alérion – Rioux, René – Ornithopter
 Robert Aéroplane
 Rollé 1922 glider – Rolle, J.
 Rousset glider – Rousset, Mauritius
 Sablier Perfo-E
 Sablier type 8
 Saucède PLS-1 – Saucede, Lucien & Saucede, Pierre
 Savoyas Hirondelle
 SBT (glider) – Saboureault, Paul & Touza, Joseph & Boussiere, Edouard
 Scrive 1908 glider – Scrive, Didier
 Scrive-Coquard SC – Scrive, Didier & Coquard, Marcel
 Sevimia SM-20 – (Victor Minié Aviation)
 SNCASE PM-110 Midi – Robert Castello & Al. – S.N.C.A.S.E. (Société Nationale de Constructions Aéronautiques du Sud-Est)
 SNCASE PM-200 – Robert Castello & Al. – S.N.C.A.S.E. (Société Nationale de Constructions Aéronautiques du Sud-Est)
 SNCASO SO-P1 Ferblantine – Société Nationale des Constructions Aéronautiques du Sud-Ouest
 Stark AS-07 Stabiplan – Starck, André
 Thomas 1923 glider – Thomas, A.
 Thorouss 1922 glider – Thorouss, Gustave
 Tomasini 1923 glider – Tomasini, Charles
 Truchet Tr-301 Abyssin – Trucet, Jean-Marc
 Valette (glider) – Valette, Aimé
 Verrimst-Maneyrol – Verrimst, Robert & Maneyrol, Alexis
 Voisin LV-104 – Voisin, Gabriel & Voisin, Charles
 Vuillemenot AE-15

Notes

Further reading

External links

Lists of glider aircraft